Pleopeltis is a genus of ferns in the family Polypodiaceae, subfamily Polypodioideae, according to the Pteridophyte Phylogeny Group classification of 2016 (PPG I). The genus widely distributed in tropical regions of the world, and also north into temperate regions in eastern North America and eastern Asia. Several species are known by the common name scaly polypody and resurrection fern.

The genus is closely related to Polypodium. Many of the species have been or sometimes are still included in that genus. Further changes in the circumscription of the genus may occur as research continues.

They are epiphytic, epipetric (growing on rocks), or rarely terrestrial ferns, with a creeping, densely hairy or scaly rhizome bearing fronds at intervals along its length. The fronds are evergreen, persisting for 1–2 years, and are entire or deeply pinnatifid. The sori or groups of spore-cases (sporangia) are borne on the back of the frond.

Species 
, Checklist of Ferns and Lycophytes of the World accepted the following species and hybrids:

Pleopeltis acicularis (Weath.) A.R.Sm. & T.Krömer
Pleopeltis alansmithii (R.C.Moran) A.R.Sm. & Tejero
Pleopeltis alborufula (Brade) Salino
Pleopeltis angusta Humb. & Bonpl. ex Willd.
Pleopeltis appressa M.Kessler & A.R.Sm.
Pleopeltis × aspidiolepis (Baker) A.R.Sm.
Pleopeltis astrolepis (Liebm.) E.Fourn.
Pleopeltis aturensis (Maury) A.R.Sm.
Pleopeltis balaonensis (Hieron.) A.R.Sm.
Pleopeltis ballivianii (Rosenst.) A.R.Sm.
Pleopeltis × bartlettii (Weath.) A.R.Sm. & Tejero
Pleopeltis bombycina (Maxon) A.R.Sm.
Pleopeltis bradei (de la Sota) Salino
Pleopeltis bradeorum (Rosenst.) A.R.Sm. & Tejero
Pleopeltis buchtienii (Christ & Rosenst.) A.R.Sm.
Pleopeltis burchellii (Baker) Hickey & Sprunt ex A.R.Sm.
Pleopeltis × cerro-altoensis Danton & Boudrie
Pleopeltis christensenii A.R.Sm.
Pleopeltis coenosora R.C.Moran
Pleopeltis collinsii (Maxon) A.R.Sm. & Tejero
Pleopeltis complanata (Weath.) E.A.Hooper
Pleopeltis constricta Sprunt & Hickey
Pleopeltis conzattii (Weath.) R.M.Tryon & A.F.Tryon
Pleopeltis crassinervata (Fée) T.Moore
Pleopeltis cryptocarpa (Fée) A.R.Sm. & Tejero
Pleopeltis desvauxii (Klotzsch) Salino
Pleopeltis disjuncta M.Kessler & A.R.Sm.
Pleopeltis ecklonii (Kunze) A.R.Sm.
Pleopeltis fallacissima (Maxon) A.R.Sm. & Tejero
Pleopeltis fallax (Schltdl. & Cham.) Mickel & Beitel
Pleopeltis fayorum (R.C.Moran & B. Øllg.) A.R.Sm.
Pleopeltis fimbriata (Maxon) A.R.Sm.
Pleopeltis fossa Moore
Pleopeltis fraseri (Kuhn) A.R.Sm.
Pleopeltis friedrichsthaliana (Kunze) A.R.Sm. & Tejero
Pleopeltis fructuosa (Maxon & Weath.) Lellinger
Pleopeltis furcata (L.) A.R.Sm.
Pleopeltis furfuracea (Schltdl. & Cham.) A.R.Sm. & Tejero
Pleopeltis guttata (Maxon) E.G.Andrews & Windham
Pleopeltis gyroflexa (Christ) Schwartsb. (syn. P. repanda)
Pleopeltis hirsutissima (Raddi) de la Sota
Pleopeltis hookeri A.R.Sm.
Pleopeltis insularum (C.V.Morton) A.R.Sm.
Pleopeltis intermedia M.Kessler & A.R.Sm.
Pleopeltis lepidopteris (Langsd. & Fisch.) de la Sota
Pleopeltis lepidotricha (Fée) A.R.Sm. & Tejero
Pleopeltis × leucospora (Klotzsch) Moore
Pleopeltis lindeniana (Kunze) A.R.Sm. & Tejero
Pleopeltis macrocarpa (Bory ex Willd.) Kaulf.
Pleopeltis macrolepis (Maxon) A.R.Sm. & Tejero
Pleopeltis madrensis (J.Sm.) A.R.Sm. & Tejero
Pleopeltis marginata A.R.Sm. & Tejero
Pleopeltis masafuerae (Phil.) de la Sota
Pleopeltis megalolepis (Maxon & C.V.Morton) A.R.Sm.
Pleopeltis × melanoneura Mickel & Beitel
Pleopeltis mexicana (Fée) Mickel & Beitel
Pleopeltis michauxiana (Weath.) Hickey & Sprunt
Pleopeltis microgrammoides (Mickel & A.R.Sm.) A.R.Sm. & Tejero
Pleopeltis minarum (Weath.) Salino
Pleopeltis minima (Bory) J.Prado & R.Y.Hirai
Pleopeltis monoides (Weath.) Salino
Pleopeltis monosora (Desv.) A.R.Sm.
Pleopeltis montigena (Maxon) A.R.Sm. & Tejero
Pleopeltis munchii (Christ) A.R.Sm.
Pleopeltis murora (Hook.) A.R.Sm. & Tejero
Pleopeltis myriolepis (Christ) A.R.Sm. & Tejero
Pleopeltis nicklesii (Tardieu) Alston
Pleopeltis oreophila Sundue
Pleopeltis orientalis Sundue
Pleopeltis panamensis (Weath.) Pic. Serm.
Pleopeltis pinnatifida Gill.
Pleopeltis × pinnatisecta (Brade) A.R.Sm.
Pleopeltis platylepis (Mett. ex Kuhn) A.R.Sm. & Tejero
Pleopeltis plebeia (Schltdl. & Cham.) A.R.Sm. & Tejero
Pleopeltis pleopeltidis (Fée) de la Sota
Pleopeltis pleopeltifolia (Raddi) Alston
Pleopeltis polylepis (Roem. ex Kunze) T.Moore
Pleopeltis polypodioides (L.) E.G.Andrews & Windham
Pleopeltis pycnocarpa (C.Chr.) A.R.Sm.
Pleopeltis pyrrholepis (Fée) A.R.Sm. & Tejero
Pleopeltis remota (Desv.) A.R.Sm.
Pleopeltis riograndensis (T.Wendt) E.G.Andrews & Windham
Pleopeltis rosei (Maxon) A.R.Sm. & Tejero
Pleopeltis rzedowskiana (Mickel) A.R.Sm. & Tejero
Pleopeltis sanctae-rosae (Maxon) A.R.Sm. & Tejero
Pleopeltis segregata (Baker) A.R.Sm.
Pleopeltis × simiana (Schelpe & N.C.Anthony) N.R.Crouch & Klopper
Pleopeltis × sordidula (Maxon & Weath.) Mickel & Beitel
Pleopeltis squamata (L.) J.Sm.
Pleopeltis steirolepis (C.Chr.) A.R.Sm.
Pleopeltis stolzei A.R.Sm.
Pleopeltis subnuda (C.Chr.) A.R.Sm.
Pleopeltis subvestita (Maxon) A.R.Sm.
Pleopeltis thyssanolepis (A.Braun ex Klotzsch) E.G.Andrews & Windham
Pleopeltis tico (A.Rojas) A.R.Sm.
Pleopeltis × tricholepis (Mickel & Beitel) A.R.Sm. & Tejero
Pleopeltis tridens J.Sm.
Pleopeltis trindadensis (Brade) Salino
Pleopeltis tweediana (Hook.) A.R.Sm.
Pleopeltis villagranii (Copel.) A.R.Sm. & Tejero
Pleopeltis wiesbaurii (Sodiro) Lellinger
Pleopeltis xantholepis (Harr.) A.R.Sm.

References

 
Epiphytes
Fern genera
Taxa named by Alexander von Humboldt
Taxa named by Aimé Bonpland